Thylacosceles cerata is a moth of the family Stathmopodidae. This species is endemic to New Zealand. It was first described by Alfred Philpott in 1918.

References

Moths of New Zealand
Moths described in 1918
Stathmopodidae
Endemic fauna of New Zealand
Taxa named by Alfred Philpott
Endemic moths of New Zealand